Palpita pratti is a moth in the family Crambidae. It is found in Indonesia (Seram and Sumatra) and Australia.

Subspecies
Palpita pratti pratti (Indonesia: Seram)
Palpita pratti immajorina (Inoue, 1997) (Indonesia: Sumatra)

References

Palpita
Moths described in 1924
Moths of Indonesia
Moths of Australia